Bajro Gegić is a Serbian politician from the country's Bosniak community. He was the mayor of Tutin from 2008 to 2012 and has served for two terms in the National Assembly of Serbia. A member of the Party of Democratic Action of Sandžak (Stranka demokratske akcije Sandžaka, SDA) for many years, he left the party in 2020 to form his own local political group.

Early life and private career
Gegić was born in Tutin, in the Sandžak region of what was then the People's Republic of Serbia in the Federal People's Republic of Yugoslavia. Raised in the community, he graduated in mathematics from the Faculty of Natural Science and Mathematics, was a professor for more than twenty years, and then worked as an education inspector.

Politician
The SDA-led List for Sandžak (Lista za Sandžak, LZS) alliance won a majority victory in Tutin in the 2004 Serbian local elections, and Gegić was afterward appointed as the municipality's deputy mayor. He served in this role for the next four years, working under the directly elected mayor Šemsudin Kučević. He was also appointed as one of the SDA's representatives in the Serbian government in 2005, working as a state secretary in the education ministry until 2008.

Gegić appeared in the thirteenth position on the LZS's electoral list in the 2007 Serbian parliamentary election and the eleventh position on the successor "Bosniak List for a European Sandžak" in the 2008 election. Each list won two mandates, and he was not given a seat on either occasion. (From 2000 to 2011, mandates in Serbian parliamentary elections were awarded to sponsoring parties or coalitions rather than individual candidates, and it was common practice for the mandates to be assigned out of numerical order. Gegić could have been awarded a mandate on either occasion, but he was not.)

The direct election of mayors was abolished with the 2008 Serbian local elections. The SDA won another majority victory in Tutin in this cycle, and Kučević was initially chosen by the elected delegates for another term as mayor. He resigned shortly thereafter to become a deputy director in Serbia's Office for Sustainable Development of Underdeveloped Areas. Gegić was named as Kučević's successor and served as mayor for the remainder of the four-year term. While in office, he oversaw the establishment of the first windmill in Serbia, in the village of Leskova, and announced plans for more wind turbines in the area. In 2010, he articulated the municipality's infrastructural challenges in an interview with Danas.

Parliamentarian

First term (2012–14) and after
Serbia's electoral system was reformed in 2011, such that parliamentary mandates were awarded in numerical order to candidates on successful lists. The SDA fielded its own list in the 2012 parliamentary election; Gegić was given the second position and was elected when the party won two mandates. SDA leader Sulejman Ugljanin was re-appointed as a minister without portfolio in Serbia's government after the election, and the SDA supported the administration in the assembly. In his first term, Gegić was a member of the parliamentary friendship groups with Azerbaijan, Bosnia and Herzegovina, Cyprus, Germany, Montenegro, Tunisia, and Turkey.

Gegić also received the second position on the SDA's list for the Tutin municipal assembly in the 2012 local elections (after Kučević) and was re-elected when the list won another majority victory with twenty-one out of thirty-seven mandates. Kučević was again chosen as mayor, and Gegić resigned from the local assembly on 21 June 2012.

He was dropped to the ninth position on the SDA's list for the 2014 parliamentary election and, as the party won only three seats, was not re-elected. He was later given the second position on the SDA's "For Bosniak Unity" list in the 2014 election for the Bosniak National Council and was elected when the list won a majority victory with nineteen out of thirty-five seats. Gegić also served on the presidency of the SDA in this period, although he stood down in January 2015. It was reported at this time that there were serious divisions in the SDA's Tutin branch between supporters of Kučević and supporters of Gegić.

Second term (2016–20) and after
Gegić was given the fourth position on the SDA's list in the 2016 parliamentary election. The list won two seats, and he was not initially elected; he was, however, awarded a mandate on 10 August 2016, after Ugljanin resigned and the third-ranked candidate declined to serve. He took his seat in parliament the following day. The SDA served in opposition in the term that followed, in a parliamentary grouping with the Liberal Democratic Party (Liberalno demokratska partija, LDP) and the League of Social Democrats of Vojvodina (Liga socijaldemokrata Vojvodine, LSV). Gegić was a member of the parliamentary committee on constitutional and legislative issues and a deputy member of the health and family committee and the committee on education, science, technological development, and the information society.

Notwithstanding his rivalry with Kučević, Gegić once again received the second position on the SDA's list in Tutin for the 2016 local elections and was re-elected when the party won another majority victory with twenty-two seats. This time, he remained a member of the local assembly for the entire term that followed. Kučević died in a car accident in 2017.

Gegić did not seek re-election to the Bosniak National Council in 2018.

He was expelled from the SDA in February 2020 after organizing his own electoral list in Tutin. The list, known as "Tutin in First Place," won five out of thirty-seven seats, as the SDA fell below an absolute majority for the first time in several years. Gegić appeared in the lead position on the list and remains a member of the municipal assembly as of 2022. He was not a candidate in the 2020 Serbian parliamentary election, and his term in the national assembly ended in that year.

The SDA has Tutin has remained divided, and in late 2022 it was reported that the local parliament had become dysfunctional. In November 2022, Gegic's party and the Sandžak Democratic Party (Sandžačka demokratska partija, SDP) joined the local government, providing it with a working majority in the assembly.

References

1954 births
Living people
People from Tutin, Serbia
Bosniaks of Serbia
Mayors of places in Serbia
Members of the National Assembly (Serbia)
Members of the Bosniac National Council (Serbia)
Party of Democratic Action of Sandžak politicians